The 2011 India Super Series was the fourth super series tournament of the 2011 BWF Super Series. It was the first competition under the new format where a select group of Super Series events were elevated to premier status. The tournament was held in New Delhi, India from 26 April – 1 May 2011 and had a total purse of $200,000.

Men's singles

Seeds

Top half

Bottom half

Finals

Women's singles

Seeds

Top half

Bottom half

Finals

Men's doubles

Seeds

Top half

Bottom half

Finals

Women's doubles

Seeds

Top half

Bottom half

Finals

Mixed doubles

Seeds

Top half

Bottom half

Finals

References

2011 India Super Series
India Super Series
India
Sport in New Delhi